Yu Jim-yuen (September 5, 1905 – September 8, 1997) was a Chinese martial artist, actor, teacher and the master of the China Drama Academy, one of the main Peking Opera Schools in Hong Kong from which Jackie Chan, Sammo Hung, Yuen Biao, Yuen Qiu, Yuen Wah, and Corey Yuen received their training. He was also the father of early wuxia actress Yu So-chow, who appeared in more than 150 movies, but his only film was The Old Master (師父出馬), in 1979,  as Wen Ren-yang. He died of a heart attack in Los Angeles, California, United States.

In 1988, the film Painted Faces was released. The story dealt with the lives of the children in the China Drama Academy, and Sammo Hung played the part of Master Yu.

See also
 Peking Opera School
 Peking opera

External links
 
 

1905 births
1997 deaths
20th-century Hong Kong male actors
20th-century Hong Kong male singers
Male actors from Beijing
Male Peking opera actors
Singers from Beijing